The Sony CLIÉ PEG-SL10 is a Personal digital assistant made by Sony. It was released in 2002 alongside PEG-SJ20 and PEG-SJ30, two higher end models features better screen and built-in lithium battery. All three products feature with Motorola Dragonball VZ 33Mhz Processor and Palm OS 4.1S 

SL-10 is the only model in SL series and the last model to use AAA battery in CLIÉ product line. Like most of CLIÉ products, it includes a few variants designated to different region: PEG-SL10/U, PEG-SL10/E and PEG-SL/J

Specifications
Palm OS:4.1S
CPU: Motorola DragonBall VZ 33 MHz
Input devices: Touchscreen, Graffiti, Jog Dial with back button
RAM: 8MB
ROM: 4MB
Display: 320 X 320, 4-bit grayscale
Backlit: Yes, Green Color Backlit
External connectors: PEG-SL/SJ/T connector, Mini USB
Expansion: Memory Stick, up to 256MB
Wireless: Infrared
Batteries: 2 AAA
Color: Silver w/ black face
Form factor: similar to Palm III
Size: Weight: 3.6 oz, Dimensions: 4.1 x 2.9 x 0.7 in - smaller than a Palm IIIc and slightly smaller (but thicker) than a Palm TX

Bundled Software
 CLIE Paint
 gMovie
 PhotoStand
 PG Pocket

SL10